The 2006 World Field Archery Championships were held in Gothenburg, Sweden.

Medal summary (Men's individual)

Medal summary (Women's individual)

Medal summary (Men's Team)

Medal summary (Women's Team)

Medal summary (Men's Juniors)

Medal summary (Women's Juniors)

Medal summary (Junior Men's Team)

References

E
2006 in Swedish sport
International archery competitions hosted by Sweden
World Field Archery Championships